The Papiermark ('paper mark', officially just Mark, sign: ℳ) was the German currency from 4 August 1914 when the link between the Goldmark and gold was abandoned, due to the outbreak of World War I. In particular, the Papiermark was the currency issued during the hyperinflation in Germany of 1922 and 1923.

History

From 1914, the value of the mark fell. The rate of inflation rose following the end of World War I and reached its highest point in October 1923. The currency stabilized in November 1923 after the announcement of the creation of the Rentenmark, although the Rentenmark did not come into circulation until 1924. When it did, it replaced the Papiermark at the rate of 1 trillion (1012)-ℳ to RM1. On 30 August 1924 the Rentenmark was replaced by the Reichsmark.

In addition to the issues of the government, emergency issues of both tokens and paper money, known as Kriegsgeld (war money) and Notgeld (emergency money), were produced by local authorities.

The Papiermark was also used in the Free City of Danzig until replaced by the Danzig Gulden in late 1923. Several coins and emergency issues in Papiermark were issued by the free city.

Coins

During the war, cheaper metals were introduced for coins, including aluminium, zinc and iron, although silver ℳ pieces continued in production until 1919. Aluminium 1₰ were produced until 1918 and the 2₰ until 1916. Whilst iron 5₰, both iron and zinc 10₰ and aluminium 50₰ coins were issued until 1922. Aluminium 3ℳ were issued in 1922 and 1923, and aluminium 200ℳ and 500ℳ were issued in 1923. The quality of many of these coins varied from decent to poor.

During this period, many provinces and cities also had their own corresponding coin and note issues, referred to as Notgeld currency. This came about often due to a shortage of exchangeable tender in one region or another during the war and hyperinflation periods. Some of the most memorable of these to be issued during this period came from Westphalia and featured the highest face value denominations on a coin ever, eventually reaching 1,000,000,000,000ℳ.

Banknotes

First World War issues
In 1914, the State Loan Office began issuing paper money known as Darlehnskassenscheine (loan fund notes). These circulated alongside the issues of the Reichsbank. Most were 1ℳ and 2ℳ notes but there were also 5ℳ, 20ℳ, 50ℳ and 100ℳ notes.

Post War issues
The victor nations in World War I decided to assess Germany for their costs of conducting the war against Germany. With no means of paying in gold or currency backed by reserves, Germany ran the presses, causing the value of the Mark to collapse.
Between 1914 and the end of 1923 the Papiermark's rate of exchange against the U.S. dollar plummeted from 4.2ℳ = US$1 to 4.2 trillionℳ = US$1. The price of one gold mark (0.35842g gold weight) in German paper currency at the end of 1918 was 2ℳ, but by the end of 1919 a gold mark cost 10ℳ. This inflation worsened between 1920 and 1922, and the cost of a gold mark (or conversely the devaluation of the paper mark) rose from 15ℳ to 1,282ℳ. In 1923 the value of the paper mark had its worst decline. By July, the cost of a gold mark had risen to 101,112ℳ, and in September was already at 13 million-ℳ. On 30 Nov 1923 it cost 1 trillion-ℳ to buy a single gold mark.

In October 1923, Germany experienced a 29,500% hyperinflation (roughly 21% interest per day). Historically, this one-month inflation rate has only been exceeded three times: Yugoslavia, 313,000,000% (64.6% per day, January 1994); Zimbabwe, 79.6 billion% (98% per day, November 2008); and Hungary, 41.9 quadrillion% (207% per day, July 1946).

On 15 November 1923 the Papiermark was replaced by the rentenmark at RM4.2 rentenmark = US$1, or 1 trillion-ℳ = RM1 (exchangeable through July 1925).

During the hyperinflation, ever higher denominations of banknotes were issued by the Reichsbank and other institutions (notably the Reichsbahn railway company). The Papiermark was produced and circulated in enormously large quantities. Before the war, the highest denomination was 1,000ℳ, equivalent to approximately £stg.50 or US$238. In early 1922, 10,000ℳ notes were introduced, followed by 100,000ℳ and 1 million-ℳ notes in February 1923. July 1923 saw notes up to 50 million-ℳ, with 10 milliard (1010)-ℳ notes introduced in September. The hyperinflation peaked in October 1923 and banknote denominations rose to 100 trillion (1014)-ℳ. At the end of the hyperinflation, these notes were worth approximately £5Stg or US$24.

Weimar Republic (1920–24)

Danzig
The Danziger Privat Actien-Bank (opened 1856) was the first bank established in Danzig. They issued two series of notes denominated in thalers (1857 and 1862–73) prior to issuing the mark (1875, 1882, 1887). These mark issues are extremely rare. The Ostbank fur Handel and Gewerbe opened 16 March 1857, and by 1911 two additional banks (the Imperial Bank of Germany and the Norddeutsche Credit-Anstalt) were in operation.

Issuance of the Danzig Papiermark
The Papiermark was issued by Danzig from 1914 to 1923. Five series were issued during World War I by the City Council (1914, 1916, 1918 first and second issue, and 1919). Denominations ranged from 10₰ to 20ℳ. The Free City of Danzig municipal senate issued an additional four post-World War I series of notes (1922, 1923 First issue, 1923 Provisional issue, and 1923 Inflation issue). The 1922 issue (31 October 1922) was denominated in 100ℳ, 500ℳ, and 1,000ℳ notes. The denominations for the 1923 issue were 1,000ℳ (15 March 1923), and 10,000ℳ and 50,000ℳ notes (20 March 1923).  The 1923 provisional issue reused earlier notes with a large red stamp indicating the new (and higher) denominations of 1 million-ℳ (8 August 1923) and 5 million-ℳ (15 October 1923) mark. The last series of Danzig mark was the 1923 inflation issue of 1 million-ℳ (8 August 1923), 10 million-ℳ (31 August 1923), 100 million-ℳ (22 September 1923), 500 million-ℳ (26 September 1923), 5 billion-ℳ and 10 billion-ℳ notes (11 October 1923). The Danzig mark was replaced by the Danzig gulden, first issued by the Danzig Central Finance Department on 22 October 1923.

Note on numeration

In German, Milliarde is 1,000,000,000, or one thousand million, while Billion is 1,000,000,000,000, or one million million.

See also

1922 in Germany
1923 in Germany
Hyperinflation
Hyperinflation in Zimbabwe
Inflation hedge

Notes

Citations

References

GermanNotes.com (2005). German Paper Money 1871-1999. eBook from germannotes.com

External links
Exchange rates

Currencies of Germany
Economy of the Weimar Republic
Modern obsolete currencies
Economic history of World War I
Currencies of Poland
Free City of Danzig
1923 disestablishments
1920s economic history
1923 in Europe